Kodovjat is a village and a former municipality in the Elbasan County, central Albania. At the 2015 local government reform it became a subdivision of the municipality Gramsh. The population at the 2011 census was 2,355. The municipal unit consists of the villages Kodovjat, Bratilë, Bulcar, Kishte, Kokel, Posnovisht, Shelcan, Bersnik i Poshtëm, Bersnik i Sipërm, Mashan and Broshtan.

References

Former municipalities in Elbasan County
Administrative units of Gramsh, Elbasan
Villages in Elbasan County